Filatima incomptella is a moth of the family Gelechiidae. It is found in Scandinavia, the Baltic region, Germany, Poland, European Russia and Siberia (Transbaikal).

The wingspan is 14–16 mm.

The larvae feed on Salix caprea and Salix repens.

References

Moths described in 1854
Filatima
Moths of Europe